Cabinet of Hugon Hanke (Polish: Rząd Hugona Hanke) was a brief administration of the Polish Government in Exile, formed on August 8 and dismissed on September 10, 1955.
 Hugon Hanke (Labor Party, SP), Prime Minister.
 Kazimierz Okulicz, Minister of Justice.
 Zygmunt Rusinek, Minister of Émigrés' Affairs.
 Stanisław Sopicki (SP), Minister of the Treasury, Industry and Trade.
 Gen. Michał Tokarzewski-Karaszewicz, Minister of National Defense.
 Antoni Pająk (ZSP), Minister of Congress.

Hanke, Hugon
1955 establishments in Poland
1955 disestablishments in Poland
Cabinets established in 1955
Cabinets disestablished in 1955